2020 Herculis was the 34th edition of the annual outdoor track and field meeting held on 14 August 2020 at the Stade Louis II in Monaco. It was the first leg of the 2020 Diamond League, which had been delayed due to the COVID-19 pandemic.

Uganda's Joshua Cheptegei set a new 5000 metres world record of 12:35.36 minutes, knocking two seconds off the previous record set by Kenenisa Bekele in 2004.

Results

Men

Women

References

Results
"Wanda Diamond League Monaco (MON) 14th August 2020 Results". Diamond League (2020-09-10). Retrieved 2021-05-05.

External links
Official website 

2020
2020 in Monégasque sport
2020 Diamond League
Herculis